As of 2006, the South Korean Ministry of Unification registered about 9,000 North Koreans in South Korea. Many thousands of them escaped from North to South as a result of the North Korean famine of 1994–1998. North Koreans living in South Korea are often mistreated at schools, denied employment, and are subject to other kinds of ethnic issues due to their being from North Korea.

Terminology 
The government of South Korea looked to promote unification in 2005, by diminishing the use of Cold War Era terms such as "defectors" or "escapees" when referring to North Korean Migrants. The old terms suggested negative connotations and derogatory use. Instead they opted to use a new term, saeteomin. Saeteomin means "new settlers" and emphasizes the migrant characteristics of the people.

History 
The Democratic People's Republic of Korea, or the DPRK, adheres to a strict Stalinist pattern of zero tolerance towards overseas migration. However, after the Korean War, North Korean defectors began to try and escape to South Korea in search of a better life. Before the start of the Korean War, the number of migrators between the North and the South was between 456,000 and 829,000. Through the years 1950-1953, an estimated 400,000–650,000 people migrated. Between 1945 to 1953, about 10 percent of the population left the North, but these numbers dramatically decreased after the war was over.

The DMZ Line

The Korean Demilitarized Zone, between North and South Korea, exists to keep external and internal threats to a minimum. External threats could come from the possibility of South Korean agents making their way into the country. Any internal threats include the possibility of non-authorized attempts to leave. The DMZ Line is protected by electric fences, minefields, and soldiers. Extra support of fenced and mined beaches, patrols, and surveillance of the area make it nearly impossible to cross.

China's role 
As the journey to South Korea was so difficult, China found itself receiving a large number of North Korean defectors. If able to cross, defectors were able to find employment in Northeast China. When the North Korean Famine reached its peak in 1988–1989, almost 200,000 defectors were found in China. After radical liberalization of China, the number of defectors largely increased from 41-1,894 annually.

Government assistance 
The South Korean government, in 1997, passed the Act on Protection and Resettlement Support for the Residents Who Escaped From North Korea. The result of the act was 36,960,000 won for each adult defector. The government also increased job training procedures and attempted to address other problems migrants might face in their new life in South Korea. In 2005, the South Korean government launched a scholarship program that allotted up to 15.4 million won per person to achieve vocational training, certifications, and eventually jobs. Although the program gave money to assist in job searching, it also reduced the amount of settlement money from 39.5 million won to 20 million won per person.

Economics 
At the beginning of North Korean migration to South Korea, the population was mostly considered privileged and upper class. More recently, the population has become more heterogeneous and includes people of all education, age, and employment backgrounds. It has been found that there is a correlation between high levels of education and employment as compared to low levels of education and unemployment. Depression, PTSD, and chronic illness are also large factors in the ability to find a job after defecting. Those more likely to find jobs are males who either had an educational background or a technical license. Refugees who experience chronic illnesses make 89.5 percent less than those who do not. Similarly, those who report cases of PTSD make 184.6 percent less than those who do not experience trauma related events. In the year 2001, the average income of a North Korean migrant was 59.98 won. The average in come of South Korean citizens in 2005 was 1,390,000 won compared to the less than 1,000,000 won of North Korean migrants.

These new settlers come from many different paths on their way to South Korea, including going through China, Mongolia, and Southeast Asia. In 2003, a survey done by the Korea Institute for National Unification, showed that 24.6 percent of respondents were very satisfied with their overall life in South Korea as compared to the 1 percent of those who are very unsatisfied. In 2005, the Database Center for North Korean Human Rights, reported that 22.7 percent of respondents claimed that the biggest obstacle in their new life were "economic difficulties". Income inequality between South Korean citizens and the saeteomin was a large issue. Many reported lower incomes due to unemployment or not being able to keep the same job.

Some North Korean migrants even report problems of prejudice and discrimination. 56.5 percent of respondents from a study done by the Korea Institute for National Unification in 2005, responded yes to having faced difficulty in the workplace for being from North Korea. A large number of North Koreans in South Korea report issues with promotions and salaries compared to their South Korean colleagues.

Education 
For many who make the treacherous journey from North to South Korea, those with children hope to give their kids a better education. Reports show that there are large numbers of saeteomin who have difficulty in their school life. In 2005, attendance rates for middle schoolers was 58.4 percent and attendance rates for high schoolers was 10.4 percent. Even more, the dropout rate was 13.7 percent which is ten times higher than the rates of South Korean students. Reasons for these numbers include the lack of education during their time between living in North Korea and South Korea, lack of adjustment to new culture, and placement in schools.

Interaction between North and South Koreans 
The year 2003 showed 1.9 percent of South Koreans had no feelings towards the new settlers and 58 percent felt compatriotism. The majority of South Koreans expressed no specific connection with their new neighbors, with 1.9 percent feeling distant and 7 percent feeling very friendly. Many saeteomin face the feeling of emotional distance in their new homes. Many reasons for this include language barriers due to English loan words, slang, and the South Korean dialect.

Geographic origin 
In the years 1999–2003, 66 percent of North Korean settlers were found to be from North Hamgyong Province. Those from this northeastern part of the country have a background of poverty, little education, and unemployment.

Famous defectors 

 Hwang Jang-yop, one of the highest-ranking elite members of Pyongyang, fled North Korea in 1997. While in office, he led as a political party secretary, President of Kim Il-sung University, and personal clerk to Kim Il-sung. After disagreeing with Kim Jong-il in the 1990's over the succession of power, Hwang left the country and went to the South Korean Embassy in China where disputes over his standing were held. Eventually, he was able to fly to Seoul, where he has become one of the most outspoken against the Kim regime. On October 10, 2010, Hwang was found dead in his home after being in exile for 13 years.

See also
 List of North Korean defectors in South Korea
 North Korea–South Korea relations
 North Korean defectors

References

North Korean diaspora
Demographics of South Korea
 
North Korea–South Korea relations